Arianna Barbieri (born 23 February 1989) is an Italian swimmer.

Biography
In 2012 Arianna Barbieri qualified for her first Olympic appearance in London 2012, she competed in the 100 m backstroke and the Italian 4 x 100 m medley relay team.

See also
Italy at the 2012 Summer Olympics - Swimming

References

External links
Swimmer profile at CONI website

1989 births
Living people
Italian female backstroke swimmers
Olympic swimmers of Italy
Swimmers at the 2012 Summer Olympics
European Aquatics Championships medalists in swimming

Mediterranean Games bronze medalists for Italy
Swimmers at the 2013 Mediterranean Games
Mediterranean Games medalists in swimming
20th-century Italian women
21st-century Italian women